Thorsten Schmidt (born 14 October 1978) is a German rower. He competed in the men's lightweight coxless four event at the 2000 Summer Olympics.

References

External links
 

1978 births
Living people
German male rowers
Olympic rowers of Germany
Rowers at the 2000 Summer Olympics
Sportspeople from Bonn